Fantasy Island is an amusement park located in Ingoldmells on the East Coast of England. Opened in 1995, the Resort is situated in an area nearby various Holiday Parks. It is known for its signature pyramid structure located in the centre of the park, which contains many indoor rides and attractions, as well as restaurants and other facilities.

History
The Resort was officially opened as Fantasy Island in 1995 by Blue Anchor Leisure.

On May 22, 1999, Fantasy Island opened its first roller coaster with an inversion, Millennium.

On May 23, 2002, Fantasy Island's second coaster to feature multiple inversions, Jubilee Odyssey opened.

On 5 August 2014, Fantasy Island announced that it had entered administration. The Resort continued to operate whilst the finances were reviewed. Duff & Phelps was appointed as Fantasy Island's administrator.

Mellors Group acquired Fantasy Island in 2016 following the 2014 administration. Mellors Group planned to improve the attractions; including the re-installation of G-Force (a Fabbri made pendulum ride), which previously operated at the Resort from 2002 to 2003.

In February 2016, Jubilee Odyssey (Now "The Odyssey") received a new colour scheme and station.

G-Force left the Resort at the end of 2017 to allow the Resort to continue with its development plans and new attractions over the coming years.

For the 2018 season, Millennium received a repaint, with purple track and green supports.

At the beginning of the 2018 season Amazing Confusion was removed from the Resort after a 15-year operation and has been replaced with many rides such as Frisbee and the Mellors Group Starflyer. In March 2019 it was announced that The Beast ( a Mondial Top Scan ) left the Resort on 31 March, and has been replaced by AirMaxx 360 for the 2019 season.

AirMaxx 360 left the Resort at the end of August 2019.

Attractions

The Odyssey
 The Odyssey (formerly The Jubilee Odyssey) is a Vekoma Suspended Looping Coaster which opened on 23 May 2002. It has a custom layout with five inversions: a Vertical Loop, Cobra Roll, Sidewinder and a Corkscrew. Standing at 167' (50.9m) tall, it is the third tallest coaster in the UK after The Big One and Stealth. It has a drop of 141' (42.98m) and speeds of up to 62 mph are achieved with a G-force of 4.8, giving it the second highest G-Force experienced on any roller coaster in the UK. The ride has one train which seats riders in twos across ten cars with a maximum number of 20 passengers. Initial plans for the Jubilee Odyssey in 2001 indicated an inverted roller coaster, 290' (88.39m) in height. These plans were rejected due to complaints from local residents; limiting the construction to a maximum of 180' (54.86m). Based on the plans, Jubilee Odyssey would have been the tallest inverted roller coaster and ranked 7th tallest roller coaster in the world. A year after Jubilee Odyssey opened; the cobra roll and the horseshoe elements were lowered. For the 2016 season it was repainted yellow with dark grey supports.

Millennium
Millennium, opened on 22 May 1999, is a Steel Coaster manufactured by Vekoma. . It was the first rollercoaster to feature an inversion at Fantasy Island. The ride is 150' tall with a loop at 100'. The ride has three inversions; two vertical loops, a sidewinder, and a top speed of 55.9 mph.  The minimum height requirement for this ride is 1.2m, children under 1.4m must be accompanied by an adult. It previously had its own token but was replaced by the Jubilee token in 2002, it now requires the use of an iCard or Discovery wristband.
 Just in time for the 2018 season Millennium has been fully refurbished with a brand new colour scheme. The track is now purple with lime green supports and the queue line has been rethemed and fitted with LED strip lights.

Magic 
'Magic', Opened in 2018, is a Magic built by German manufacturer HUSS. It is the only operating Magic in the United Kingdom, most being located in Germany under the same name. It has a capacity of 48 Riders per cycle, and is located in the far corner of the resort, next to Firebowl and the Rhombus Rocket. The ride consists of four arms on a central rotating hub, at the end of each arm is another independently rotating hub, which suspends three cars, all of which can rotate individually. The ride starts by spinning slowly, and subjecting riders to the pseudo-random movements, after ~30 seconds, the main arms raise and lower at random intervals. Each car seats four passengers, secured by a lap bar.

The Volcano
 The Volcano is a S&S Space Shot which has been operating at the park since 1998. The minimum height required is 1.4m. The ride reaches 183 ft in the air at a high speed of 50 mph.
The Volcano produces a loud sound as its compressed air system charges, which can sometimes be heard from the Butlin's Skegness Resort.

Ice Mountain
Ice Mountain is currently not at the park but will soon be back. In its place is Spinning Racer.

Ice Mountain is a Reverchon Spinning coaster that arrived at the park in 2019. It has the lowest height out of the thrill rides. The ride takes place inside a transportable warehouse where it contains theming relating to snow and ice. The attraction has previously been used at Hyde Park's Winter Wonderland and is now set to replace the parks old Reverchon Spinning Coaster 'Fantasy Mouse.' The Fantasy mouse was removed at the end of the 2018 season to make space for the Halloween attraction 'Psycho Vault and the Circus of Screams' during the park's Halloween Event. The ride is set to be better themed taking place mainly indoors and in the dark. Take note Ice Mountain is an exact replica of Fantasy Mouse, the only difference being that it is housed in the transportable warehouse.

Magical Seaquarium
Magical Seaquarium opened in 1995 with Fantasy Island. The ride system was designed and built by WGH. The scenery was made by Attraction Projects International Ltd. The ride experience includes sitting in one of 15 bamboo-themed boats and travel on an artificial river. While riding you will also experience beautifully themed underwater scenes which include animated pieces, UV lighting and an upbeat fast soundtrack unique to the ride.

Rhombus Rocket
Rhombus Rocket is a WGH Transportation-powered coaster, first opening in 1995 with the rest of the park.

In 2007 it received a major refurbishment changing the train, station and track.

For the 2019 season it received another overhaul with brown supports and gold track and a new train design. The station also got re-themed by adding trellis and changing the colours around the station.

Turbulence
New for 2020, manufactured by Zierer, it is a Starshape model originally opening as Bling at Blackpool Pleasure Beach. It was then relocated to Skyline Park as Sky Jet. In Late 2019 / early 2020 it was bought by Mellor's group and sent to Fantasy Island. However, due To COVID-19, the park decided to wait until 2021 to construct, due to the need of foundations being poured.

Firebowl
New for the 2020 Season, Firebowl is a teacups ride with large themed vehicles of giant pots. The ride formerly operated at Funland Hayling Island for almost two decades before relocating to Fantasy Island in 2020.

Starflyer
Standing at 70 meters (229 foot), Starflyer is a swing-type ride serving as a temporary replacement to Turbulence while it has technical issues. This makes it the tallest ride in the park and is the same Starflyer from Hyde Park Winter Wonderland.

Retired rides

Absolutely Insane
Opening in April 2004, Absolutely Insane was the UK's only Sky Sling. The ride was manufactured by S&S Power and launched riders to 240 ft into the air at speeds of up to 40 mph. In 2007, towards the end of the season, the ride was left standing, but not operating, until the ride was removed from the park in March 2010.

The Eye on the Coast
When The Eye on the Coast opened at the park in 2004, it was Europe's tallest Ferris wheel, standing at a mammoth 196 feet. Consisting of 40 gondolas, the ride could hold a total of 240 passengers at a time. Unfortunately, the ride was closed after just two years and was removed in 2006 as sold to the Mellors Group and now tours as the Mellors Wheel.

Topsey Turvey
Topsey Turvey was a Top Spin-type ride manufactured by Fabbri and was located where Sea Storm currently stands before it got removed from the park. It opened in the park's opening year in 1995. It was purchased from Pat Evans who had toured it during the 1994 season. It was sold to travelling showman Evan Moran in 1998 and was relocated to Pleasure Island as Terror Rack. Pleasure Island has since closed.

G-Force 
G-Force is a Giant Booster manufactured by Fabbri. It is the only one in the world and originally appeared in the 2002 and 2003 seasons before being traded for The Eye On The Coast, a Mondial Ferris wheel. It returned in the 2016 season and was then confirmed to leave at the end of the 2017 season to make way for Air Maxx 360.

Fantasy Mouse
Fantasy Mouse is a Reverchon Spinning coaster that arrived at the park in 2000. It has the lowest height out of the thrill rides. In 2015, the ride underwent a repaint that saw the orange track with blue supports replaced with a purple and green colour scheme. For the 2016 season, the ride was moved to the west side of the park and was located by The Odyssey & Amazing Confusion.

In 2016, the original Fantasy Mouse came back to the park after the blue one was sold to the Crow Family. At the end of the 2018 season, the ride was dismantled to make place for the parks Halloween Attraction Fear Island Event.

The Beast 
The Beast was a Mondial Top Scan which operated at the park from 2001 until the 31st of March 2019. It has since been repainted White and Green and goes by the new name Top Buzz operating in Saudi Arabia.

Air Maxx 360 
Seating 4 Passengers, and reaching a height of 24 metres, passengers can experience up to 4.65g's. Looping in random projectories all the time, experience negative forces.

It was a Loop Fighter built by Italian Manufacturer Technical Park.

Frisbee
Opening in 2018, Frisbee was a HUSS Frisbee originally sent from Dubai. In 2020 Fantasy Island announced that it would not be returning for the 2020 season and was replaced by Firebowl.

Hula Kula (Super Bowl)
The Hula Kula was located next to the volcano during the early years of the park.

Hoola Kula, aka Crazy Island, was a Super Bowl, located where Firebowl is currently located. It was rethemed to an island theme and moved to where Amazing Confusion previously stood. It was a generic Super Bowl, flat ride, where the cars spin like a waltzer, but the floor also tilts upwards at an angle. It was removed at the end of the 2002 season to make way for Amazing Confusion.

Amazing Confusion 

Amazing Confusion was one of only two Mondial Ultra Max rides to ever operate in the world.

Amazing Confusion was located at the back of the park next to The Odyssey and formerly Absolutely Insane. Amazing Confusion opened at Fantasy Island in 2003 and operated for 15 years before being removed at the beginning of the 2018 season where it was then replaced by Frisbee. Amazing Confusion flipped riders 360 degrees at a height of 75 ft and reaching 3.9 Gs.

As of recently Amazing Confusion can be found defunct next to the Notts County F.C. Football Club in Nottingham.

Star flyer has been recently added as a temporary ride in the park where Amazing Confusion used to be.

Operation
Whilst entry to the Resort is free, customers either pay per ride using a Fantasy I-Card or purchase an unlimited ride wristband. The pay-per-ride option uses an I-Card System, this option allows credit to be added to the I-Card to be able to use the rides in the Resort. Rides are priced depending on the ride type.

There are plenty of events throughout the season from Easter, Character Meet and Greets, Beach Party, Discount Promotional Days, Fear Island and Firework Displays.

Fantasy Island is also home to Europe's Largest 7 Day Market and the biggest Family Entertainment Centre on the East Coast of Lincolnshire.

References 

Amusement parks in England
Buildings and structures in Lincolnshire
East Lindsey District
1995 establishments in England